Princess Oradaya Debkanya (18 September 1859 - 4 April 1906) was the princess of Siam (later Thailand She was a member of the Siamese royal family and is a daughter of King mongkut and Consort Bua.

Her mother was Chao Chom Manda Bua Na Nakhon (a daughter of Phraya Nakhon (Noi Na Nakhon), She was given the full name Phra Chao Borom Wong Ther Phra Ong Chao Oradaya Debkanya by her father.

Princess Oradaya Debkanya died on 4 April 1906 at the age of 46.

References 

1859 births
1906 deaths
Thai female Phra Ong Chao
People from Bangkok
19th-century Thai women
19th-century Chakri dynasty
20th-century Thai women
20th-century Chakri dynasty
Children of Mongkut
Daughters of kings